Susan Boyle in Concert is the first concert tour by singer Susan Boyle. The tour promoted Boyle's fourth album, Standing Ovation: The Greatest Songs from the Stage.

Background
Boyle chose to launch her tour in Scotland as a thank you to her country for their support and hopes to take the tour global in 2014.  The sell-out tour ran for seven nights with appearances in Inverness, Aberdeen, Dundee, Glasgow and Edinburgh. Boyle said, "This is the year that I feel that I would be able to give an audience what they want. I’ve always wanted to do my own show and now I feel confident enough to give it a go."

Lance Ellington, a regular vocalist on Strictly Come Dancing, opened the concert with a couple of songs, before Boyle appeared and launched into a 24-song set. Other performers included Ashleigh Gray and Annie Skates as back-up singers, plus a 7-piece orchestra and the Royal Conservatoire of Scotland choir. Andrew Panton was the creative director and Kennedy Aitchison was the musical director. The entire show ran for 135 minutes.

The second leg of Boyle's tour was 19 dates across the UK in March and April 2014. Boyle said, "I’m really looking forward to getting back on tour. I’m ready to take the next step and take my show to a whole host of towns and cities I have never played in before." In May 2014, Boyle announced the third leg of the tour, to plays theatres and concert halls in the United States. The leg will begin in San Diego, California, playing 21 shows throughout October and November, ending in Jacksonville, Florida.

Concert synopsis 

For her entrance, Boyle appeared in silhouette at the back of the stage giving her famous wiggle while an audio from her Britain's Got Talent audition played. The audience responded immediately by giving her a standing ovation before she even sang a single note. It was a reminder to people from where she started and how far she has come.

For the song "Somewhere Over the Rainbow" Boyle said, "This song is about a wee lassie who goes on an incredible journey." "I hope tonight to take you all on a journey". Some of the Jazz numbers, such as "That Ole Devil Called Love" and "Cry Me a River", Boyle sang while seated beside the piano.  The first half ended with a rendition of "You Raise Me Up" accompanied by a choir from the Royal Conservatoire of Scotland.

The Second half included the song "Ae Fond Kiss" which Boyle dedicated to everyone who had lost someone in their lives.  "River Deep, Mountain High", a duet with Lance Ellington, had the audience on their feet and dancing.  The second half ended with "I Dreamed A Dream", which Boyle jokingly said, "has got me into a lot of trouble."

Throughout the concert, Boyle showed her sense of humor with jokes about her cat Pebbles and her boss Simon Cowell.  She gave her impersonation of the judges from BGT which had the audience in stitches.  The concert itself moved quickly, in which Boyle had several wardrobe changes appearing in different glamorous gowns.

Critical reception
Boyle received rave reviews for her first solo tour with several standing ovations throughout each night. The Herald Scotland, giving 4 stars, reported, "There was lot riding on this appearance, the first night of her first ever live solo tour, but the phenomenon/riddle that is Susan Boyle proved equal to her task in the Highland Capital. Truth be told she blew Eden Court Theatre away." The Edinburgh Guide, also giving 4 stars, reported, "Cynics of TV reality shows may dismiss the notion that media-created pop singers have any real talent. But to witness Susan Boyle live on stage proves beyond doubt that this performance is no gimmick. Susan has a natural purity in her voice combined with genuine emotion and the effortless art of a true Diva in glamorous style."

Opening act
Lance Ellington (Europe)

Setlist
The following songs were performed during the concert at the Eden Court Theatre in Inverness, Scotland. It does not represent all songs performed on tour.
"Out Here on My Own"
"Somewhere Over the Rainbow"
"The Winner Takes It All"
"I Know Him So Well" (duet with Ashleigh Gray)
"Wild Horses"
"That Ole Devil Called Love"
"Cry Me a River"
"The Way We Were"
"Answer Me"
"As Long as He Needs Me"
"You Raise Me Up"
Intermission 
"The Perfect Year"
"Take That Look Off Your Face"
"All I Ask of You" (duet with Lance Ellington)
"Make You Feel My Love"
"Run Like the Wind"
"Ae Fond Kiss"
"Unchained Melody"
"Hold Me, Thrill Me, Kiss Me"
"This Is the Moment" (duet with Lance Ellington)
"River Deep – Mountain High" (duet with Lance Ellington)
Encore
"You'll Never Walk Alone"
"Who I Was Born to Be"
"I Dreamed a Dream"

Tour dates

References

External links
Susan Boyle official website

2013 concert tours
2014 concert tours
Susan Boyle